"Perdere l'amore" is a 1988 song composed by  Marcello Marrocchi and Giampiero Artegiani and performed by singer Massimo Ranieri.  The song won the 38th edition of the Sanremo Music Festival, and marked the return to music of Ranieri after a decade devoted to acting. 
 
The song had been already proposed by Gianni Nazzaro to the Sanremo Festival organizers in 1987, but had been rejected in the preliminary song selection.

"Perdere l'amore" was covered by several artists, including Lara Fabian, André Hazes, Mino Reitano, and Cosimo Lizzi for his Debut EP “Amore del Passato”.

Track listing

   7" single 
 "Perdere l'amore"  (Marcello Marrocchi, Giampiero Artegiani)
 "Dove sta il poeta" (Marcello Marrocchi, Giampiero Artegiani)

Charts

Year-end charts

Lara Fabian Version
Lara Fabian covered the song on her album Pure.

References

1988 singles
Italian songs
1988 songs
Sanremo Music Festival songs
Number-one singles in Italy
Massimo Ranieri songs
Warner Music Group singles